Susanna Terracini (born April 29, 1963) is an Italian mathematician known for her research on chaos in Hamiltonian dynamical systems, including the n-body problem, reaction–diffusion systems, and the Schrödinger equation.

Terracini was born in South London. She earned a laurea in 1986 in mathematics at the University of Turin, supervised by Fulvia Skof.
She completed her Ph.D. at the International School for Advanced Studies in 1990. Her dissertation, Periodic Solutions to Singular Newtonian Systems, was supervised by Ivar Ekeland and Sergio Solimini.
She was a researcher at Paris Dauphine University from 1988 to 1989, and became a faculty member at the Polytechnic University of Milan in 1990. In 2001 she became a full professor at the University of Milano-Bicocca, and in 2012 she returned to Turin as a professor.

One of Terracini's papers on the n-body problem was selected for a featured review in Mathematical Reviews.
She was the winner of the 2002 Vinti Prize, a prize of the Italian Mathematical Union for young researchers in mathematical analysis. In 2007 she won the Bruno Finzi Prize of the Istituto Lombardo Accademia di Scienze e Lettere. 
In 2020 she was awarded the Schauder Medal from the Juliusz P. Schauder Center for Nonlinear Studies at the Nicolaus Copernicus University in Toruń, Poland.

References

External links
Home page

1963 births
Living people
20th-century Italian mathematicians
University of Turin alumni
Academic staff of the Polytechnic University of Milan
Academic staff of the University of Milano-Bicocca
Academic staff of the University of Turin
21st-century Italian mathematicians
20th-century women mathematicians
21st-century women mathematicians
International School for Advanced Studies alumni